Mostich Hill (‘Halm Mostich’ \'h&lm 'mos-tich\) is a rocky hill rising to 130 m in the southwestern part of Rugged Island off the west coast of Byers Peninsula of Livingston Island in the South Shetland Islands, Antarctica.  Situated 780 m northeast of Benson Point, 3.16 km south-southeast of Cape Sheffield, and 3.78 km west of Radev Point.

The hill is named after Mostich, Ichirgu-boil (chief boyar) of Czar Simeon the Great and Peter I of Bulgaria (10th Century AD).

Location
Spanish mapping in 1992 and Bulgarian in 2009.

Maps
 Península Byers, Isla Livingston. Mapa topográfico a escala 1:25000. Madrid: Servicio Geográfico del Ejército, 1992.
 L.L. Ivanov. Antarctica: Livingston Island and Greenwich, Robert, Snow and Smith Islands. Scale 1:120000 topographic map.  Troyan: Manfred Wörner Foundation, 2009.

References
 Mostich Hill. SCAR Composite Gazetteer of Antarctica.
 Bulgarian Antarctic Gazetteer. Antarctic Place-names Commission. (details in Bulgarian, basic data in English)

External links
 Mostich Hill. Copernix satellite image

Hills of the South Shetland Islands
Bulgaria and the Antarctic